Fominki is a rural locality (a selo) and the administrative center of Fominskoye Rural Settlement, Gorokhovetsky District, Vladimir Oblast, Russia. The population was 1,305 as of 2010. There are 17 streets.

Geography 
Fominki is located 38 km southwest of Gorokhovets (the district's administrative centre) by road. Rassvet is the nearest rural locality.

References 

Rural localities in Gorokhovetsky District